The Vishahareswara Temple is a temple to Shiva in the Thiruvarur district of Tamil Nadu, India. The temple was built in the early 9th century in the village of Kodandaramapuram, which later became part of Avanam Paruthiyur, situated on the banks of the Kudamurutti River, a tributary of the Kaveri.  The presiding deity of this temple is a form of Shiva called Vishahareswarar, and his consort Prasanna Parvathy Devi. The temple today is an ancient heritage symbol of the village. The temple was one of the 108 Shiva temples built by Cholan Aditya Varman 1, on the banks of the Kaveri.

Mythology

Once Rahu approached with his mouth agape to eclipse the Sun, he became very angry when he saw the burning rays of the Sun. He began to emit poisonous breath in his serpent form, blackening the face of the Sun.

Having lost his glorious face by Rahu's poisonous breath, the Sun sought the favor of Lord Shiva and worshiped him on the northern banks of the Kudamurutti River, a tributary of the Kaveri, under a Bilwa Tree. First Goddess Parvathy Devi blessed Sun, and then Lord Shiva himself joined her and the divine couple blessed him. Lord Shiva relieved the Sun of the evil effects of Rahus's poison and the Sun regained His charm and brightness. Rahu then felt remorse for his actions and begged Lord Shiva's pardon.

The Shiva temple that was built here to commemorate Shiva blessing the Surya. The temple hosts Shiva as Vishahareswarar, which means "poison remover", along with his consort Prasanna Parvathi Devi. Paruthiyur Vishahareshwarar temple is famous and very auspicious.

Festivals

The temple is open to the public mornings and evenings. Shivarathri is celebrated in a special way in this temple. Also, it is said that the poison of a snake will be ineffective at this place. Though there are many snakes and cobras in every nook and corner of the village, there has never been a snakebite or poison attack. It is also believed that worshiping Shiva & Parvathy here gets one relieved of the evil effects of Rahu, Kethu and Mars, and also finalizes marriages. Parithi means the Sun. Since it was here where the Sun worshiped Lord Shiva, this holy place got the name Parithipuram. People with poisonous bites and deadly diseases come from distant places and to pray to Vishahareswarar, the poison remover.

History

This Vishahareswara temple was built by Aditya Chola (C.E. 870-901). The Chola name for the temple was THIRU ADITTECHARAM. The temple was renovated and taken care by a great Shiva Bhakta by the name Paruthiyur Venkatesha Sastri, popularly known as Annaval. Annaval had spent most of his time in this temple with his parayanams of the Shiva Purana, teaching the scriptures, spreading bhakti and promoting Hindu Dharma. He was an authority on Saivite traditions. Annaval addressed several issues by answering the queries on Dharma Sastram and Hindu traditions, often posed to him by Vedic scholars and pundits. His authority on the administration of dharma made many legal luminaries come to them seeking their advice on issues concerning Hindu law. Paruthiyur Venkatesha Sastri Annaval (1770–1841), along with his brother Paruthiyur Sri Krishna Sastri Ayyaval (1773–1860), were the doyen brothers of Paruthiyur and for the Hindu Religion. The great exponent of the Ramayana, Philanthropist and Pravachan Pioneer Bramasri Paruthiyur Krishna Sastrigal (1842-1911) renovated this Vishahareswarar Temple and did Kumbhabhishekam in 1905. After renovations and construction of Rajagopuram Kumbabhishakm took place in 2017 for this temple.

See also

 Shiva Purana
 Shiva
 Paruthiyur

External links

  Paruthiyur Paramparya 
Paruthiyur Krishna Sastrigal 
  Paruthiyur Sthala Puranam
Vishahareshwara Temple
-
 Vishahareswara Temple Kumbabhishekam
 Virtual Lord Shiva Darshan and pilgrimage with videos and images
 Link to Indiantemples.com site
 Shiva Puranam

Shiva temples in Tiruvarur district